Cooke House is a historic plantation house located near Louisburg, Franklin County, North Carolina.   The house was built about 1841, and consists of a two-story, three bay, Greek Revival style frame main block with a smaller earlier one-story section.  It has brick exterior end chimneys with stepped shoulders and a wide hip-roof front porch.  It was built by Jonas Cooke (1786-1872), whose son Charles M. Cooke (1844-1920) was a noted North Carolina politician.

It was listed on the National Register of Historic Places in 1975.

The historic Shemuel Kearney House (built 1759), originally located in Franklinton, currently sits next to the Cooke House.  It was moved there in 2009 and reconstructed in 2015.

References

Plantation houses in North Carolina
Houses on the National Register of Historic Places in North Carolina
Houses completed in 1841
Greek Revival houses in North Carolina
Houses in Franklin County, North Carolina
National Register of Historic Places in Franklin County, North Carolina